1657 Roemera, provisional designation , is a stony Phocaea asteroid from the inner regions of the asteroid belt, approximately 8 kilometers in diameter. It was discovered on 6 March 1961, by Swiss astronomer Paul Wild at Zimmerwald Observatory near Bern, Switzerland, and later named after American astronomer Elizabeth Roemer.

Orbit and classification 

Roemera is a member of the Phocaea family, a large family of stony asteroids with nearly two thousand known members. It orbits the Sun in the inner main-belt at a distance of 1.8–2.9 AU once every 3 years and 7 months (1,315 days). Its orbit has an eccentricity of 0.24 and an inclination of 23° with respect to the ecliptic.

Physical characteristics 

In the Tholen classification, Roemera is a stony S-type asteroid.

Lightcurves 

In May 2008, American astronomer Brian Warner obtained a rotational lightcurve of Roemera from photometric observations at his Palmer Divide Observatory in Colorado. It gave a longer than average rotation period of 34.0 hours with a brightness variation of 0.15 magnitude. Polish astronomer Wiesław Z. Wiśniewski found a different period solution of 4.5 hours with a low amplitude of 0.09 magnitude in March 1990.

Diameter and albedo 

According to the survey carried out by NASA's Wide-field Infrared Survey Explorer with its subsequent NEOWISE mission, Roemera measures 7.66 kilometers in diameter and its surface has an albedo of 0.220, while the Collaborative Asteroid Lightcurve Link assumes a standard albedo for stony asteroids of 0.20 and calculates a diameter of 8.04 kilometers with an absolute magnitude of 12.89.

Naming 

This minor planet was named by the discoverer in honor American astronomer Elizabeth Roemer (1929–2016), U.S. Naval Observatory, in appreciation of her untiring and successful efforts to advance the knowledge of the motions and physical properties of comets and minor planets. Roemer herself discovered the asteroids 1930 Lucifer and 1983 Bok. The official  was published by the Minor Planet Center on 1 February 1965.

References

External links 
 Lightcurve plot of 1657 Roemera, Palmer Divide Observatory, B. D. Warner (2008)
 Asteroid Lightcurve Database (LCDB), query form (info )
 Dictionary of Minor Planet Names, Google books
 Asteroids and comets rotation curves, CdR – Observatoire de Genève, Raoul Behrend
 Discovery Circumstances: Numbered Minor Planets (1)-(5000) – Minor Planet Center
 
 

001657
Discoveries by Paul Wild (Swiss astronomer)
Named minor planets
001657
19610306